This is a list of members of the National Parliament of East Timor as elected at the 2001 election. They initially sat as the Constituent Assembly before the nation was granted independence in 2002, but reformed themselves into the National Assembly that year.

Lists of East Timorese politicians
2001-